Bittern Lake 218 is an Indian reserve of the Lac La Ronge Indian Band in Saskatchewan. It is 8 kilometres east of Prince Albert National Park.

References

Indian reserves in Saskatchewan
Division No. 15, Saskatchewan